Mandasa is a village in Srikakulam district of the Indian state of Andhra Pradesh. Mandasa is also known by the name Manjusha in Odia. It was ruled by erstwhile odia zamindar Rajamani royal family during British Raj. Srinivasa Rajamani was the famous Ruling chief Rajah of this estate.

This village is located at a distance of 98 km from the district headquarters.

Geography

Mandasa mandal is bordered by Sompeta mandal to the northeast, Palasa mandal to the southwest, Vajrapu Kotturu mandal to the south, Patrapur block of Ganjam district, Odisha to the north, Rayagada block of Gajapati district, Odisha to the west and Bay of Bengal to the east.

Places of importance
 Mahendragiri mountain is close to the village. A fort is located at the foot of the mountain. Mahendragiri is the highest mountain in South India.
 The temple of Vasudeva Perumal which is located in the village attracts pilgrims and tourists.
 The fort located in the center of the village reflects the rich heritage of the locality.

Mandasa Palakova
Usually Kova, as we recall, is kova stamps or kova dumplings. But there is a peculiarity to Mandasa Palakova. It has a tricky taste sharing the melody in the thick liquid.

Mandasa was once the seat of the Kalinga kings who stood at the forefront of the Eastern Ghats. Since then, it has been known for making foods with different flavors. Part of it is known as the herbal medicine Palakova.

It has a history of nearly 300 years. The Eastern Ghats are home to many medicinal plants and trees. All the towers in the area carry the grazing in the hills every day, and the milk they give the herbal milk also has medicinal properties. And hence, Mandasa Kova is so famous with its healing properties.

There are about 10 families in the village who have been practicing Kova making for generations. This Kova is made with milk and sugar just like regular Kova. However it is put ready for sale before it is pastured. Makers say that, the milk ingredients would be safe by eating the Kova before being pastured.

Demographics
According to Indian census, 2001, the demographic details of Mandasa mandal is as follows:
 Total Population: 	76,402	in 17,814 Households
 Male Population: 	37,368	and Female Population: 	39,034		
 Children Under 6-years of age: 10,823	(Boys - 5,456 and Girls - 5,367)
 Total Literates: 	38,425

Transport 
Mandasa is connected with 'Mandasa Road' railway station on Howrah-Chennai mainline in East Coast Railway, Indian Railways.

References 

Villages in Srikakulam district
Mandal headquarters in Srikakulam district